There are several rivers named Do Meio River or Rio do Meio in Brazil:

 Do Meio River (Bahia, Atlantic Ocean tributary)
 Do Meio River (Bahia, Corrente River tributary)
 Do Meio River (Bahia, Jequié River tributary)
 Do Meio River (Bahia, Peruípe River tributary)
 Do Meio River (Braço do Norte River tributary)
 Do Meio River (Itajaí River tributary)
 Do Meio River (Paraíba)
 Do Meio River (Paraná)
 Do Meio River (Rio de Janeiro)
 Do Meio River (Rio Grande do Sul)

See also 
 Paraíba do Meio River, Alagoas, Brazil